The Latin Archdiocese of Teheran-Isfahan is a particular church of the Catholic Church in Iran.

Pope Francis changed the name of this jurisdiction to the Archdiocese of Teheran-Isfahan from the Archdiocese of Isfahan on 8 January 2021.

Besides a small number of Latin rite locals, most Roman Catholics in Iran are foreigners living in the country. The majority of Catholics in Iran belong to the Chaldean Catholic Church, and there is also a small Armenian Catholic diocese.

Predecessor in the 14th century
Roman Catholic presence in Iran has always been a function of the relations between the Roman pope and the rulers of Iran. The first Roman Catholic diocese in Iran was founded by Dominicans in 1318 at Soltaniyeh which then was the capital of the Mongol Ilkhan rulers. It lasted less than 100 years into the beginning of the 15th century and disappeared during the conquests of Timur Lenk.

History
The diocese was established by Italian Dominican friars on October 12, 1629 when Isfahan was the capital of the Safavid Empire. The cathedral was situated in the then Christian suburb of New Julfa. This diocese continued under the rule of Shah Safi I.

The next appointments of bishops were only possible with longer interruptions from 1693 until 1708 (Elias Mutton) and from 1716 until 1731 (Barnabas Fedeli). The small Catholic community in Isfahan was devastated by the Afghan invasion of the city in 1722. In consequence the titular diocese was administered from the see of Baghdad with only a handful of Catholic families surviving in Isfahan.

In the 19th century Catholic missionaries were able to restart activities in Iran. From their center in Urmia, apostolic administrators tried to reorganize the Latin Church in the country. In 1896, the Lazarist missionary François Lesné was made bishop of Isfahan. Like his successor, Jacques-Emile Sontag, he resided in Urmia in Western Iran which until the First World War held a sizeable Christian population of Assyrian and Chaldaean Christians. The diocese was elevated to an archdiocese on July 1, 1910.

After the devastation of the Christian population during and after the First World War the see of Isfahan fell vacant again.

It was not until 1974 that a new archbishop of Isfahan could be instituted. For this the Dominican priest Kevin William Barden at Tehran was chosen. Since then the see of the diocese has been at Tehran. When Barden was expelled from the country in the beginning of the Islamic revolution in 1980, it took another 9 years until the Salesian Ignazio Bedini was consecrated new archbishop. Since his retirement in 2014, the diocese has been administered by an apostolic administrator.

Leadership 

 Archbishop François Lesné (Apostolic Administrator April 9, 1896 – February 11, 1910)
 Bishop Jacques-Emile Sontag, C.M. (later Archbishop) (July 13, 1910 – September 11, 1910)
 Archbishop Jacques-Emile Sontag, C.M. (September 11, 1910 – July 27, 1918)
 Archbishop Kevin William Barden, O.P. (May 30, 1974 – August 12, 1982)
 Archbishop Ignazio Bedini, S.D.B. (December 2, 1989 – 2014)
 Jack Youssef C.M., Apostolic Administrator 2015 - 2021
 Archbishop Dominique Joseph Mathieu, O.F.M. Conv,  (8 January 2021 -)

See also
List of Catholic dioceses in Iran

References

Sources
 GCatholic.org
 Catholic Hierarchy
  Daniele Federico Rosa (a cura di), La delegazione apostolica in Persia dalla creazione al 1936: alcuni cenni storici, Città del Vaticano 2011

External links 

 Art. „Ispahan“ in Catholic Encyclopedia 
 A brief history of the Lazarist mission in Iran and the Jeanne d’Arc School of Tehran
 Website about Bishop Sontag (French)
 Website of the Dominicans in Iran 
 Obituary for Bischop W. Barden 

Ispahan
Religious organizations established in the 1620s
Ispahan
1629 establishments in Iran
Culture in Isfahan